The Grampian Mountains (Am Monadh in Gaelic) is one of the three major mountain ranges in Scotland, that together occupy about half of Scotland. The other two ranges are the Northwest Highlands and the Southern Uplands. The Grampian range extends southwest to northeast between the Highland Boundary Fault and the Great Glen.

A number of rivers and streams rise in the Grampians, including the Tay, Spey, Cowie Water, Burn of Muchalls, Burn of Pheppie, Burn of Elsick, Cairnie Burn, Don, Dee and Esk. The area is generally sparsely populated.

There is some ambiguity about the extent of the range, and until the nineteenth century, they were generally considered to be more than one range, which all formed part of the wider Scottish Highlands. This view is still held by many today, and they have no single name in the Scottish Gaelic language or the Doric dialect of Lowland Scots. In both languages, a number of names are used. The name "Grampian" has been used in the titles of organisations covering parts of Scotland north of the Central Belt, including the former local government area of Grampian Region (translated into Scots Gaelic as Roinn a' Mhonaidh), NHS Grampian, and Grampian Television.

Name 

The Roman historian Tacitus recorded Mons Graupius as the site of the defeat of the native Caledonians by Gnaeus Julius Agricola c. 83 AD. The actual location of Mons Graupius, literally 'Mount Graupius' (the element 'Graupius' is of unknown meaning), is a matter of dispute among historians, though most favour a location within the Grampian massif, possibly at Raedykes, Megray Hill or Kempstone Hill. The spelling Graupius comes from the Codex Aesinas, a mediaeval copy of Tacitus's Germania believed to be from the mid-9th century.  "Graupius" was incorrectly rendered "Grampius" only in the 1476 printed edition of Tacitus's Agricola. The name Grampians is believed to have first been applied to the mountain range in 1520 by the Scottish historian Hector Boece, an adaptation of the incorrect Mons Grampius. Thus the range owes its name to this day to a typesetter's mistake. In the Middle Ages, this locale was known as the Mounth, a name still held by a number of geographical features.

Etymology 
Recorded first as Graupius in 83 A.D, the origin of the name Grampians is uncertain. The name may be Brittonic and represent a corrupted form, of which the genuine would be *Cripius, containing *crip meaning "ridge" (c.f. Welsh crib).

Extent 
There is some ambiguity about the extent of the range. Fenton Wyness, writing about Deeside, puts the northern edge of the Grampians at the River Dee in the introduction to his 1968 book Royal Valley : The Story Of The Aberdeenshire Dee:

This introduction appears to suggest that Wyness defines the Grampians as being the range of mountains running from immediately south of Aberdeen westward to Beinn Dearg in the Forest of Atholl. Similarly, Adam Watson, when defining the extent of the Cairngorms, specifically excluded the range south of the River Dee, writing:

Both Wyness and Watson appear to exclude the Cairngorms from the Grampians, regarding them as a separate range. In effect, Wyness' and Watson's definition of the Grampians is as a synonym for the Mounth. However Robert Gordon, writing in the 1650s, used the term Grampians to refer to hills on either side of the River Dee, and thus explicitly included the Cairngorms within the range.

Wyness and Watson both exclude areas west of the Pass of Drumochter from the Grampians, but the 1911 Encyclopedia Britannica adopted a wider definition, including the highlands as far as Dunbartonshire in the west.

Geology
The Grampian Mountains are chiefly made up of metamorphic and igneous rocks. The mountains are composed of granite, gneiss, marble, schists and quartzite.

The Quaternary glaciation (<2.6 Ma) eroded the region significantly, and glacial deposits, such as tills, are largely those of the last Ice Age (< 20 Ka).

Sub-ranges
The following ranges of hills and mountains fall within the generally recognised definition of the Grampians, i.e. lying between the Highland and Great Glen fault lines:

 Cairngorms
 Monadh Liath
 Mounth
 Grey Corries
 Mamores
 Ben Alder Forest
 The mountains of Glen Coe and Glen Etive
 Black Mount
 Breadalbane Hills
 Trossachs
 Arrochar Alps
 Cowal
 The Isle of Arran

See also

Ben Nevis
Buachaille Etive Mòr
Glen Coe
List of deaths on eight-thousanders
Mount Hood climbing accidents
Mountains and hills of Scotland
Scottish Highlands

References

External links

Mountains and hills of Highland (council area)
Mountains and hills of Moray
Mountains and hills of Aberdeenshire
Mountains and hills of Angus, Scotland
Mountains and hills of Perth and Kinross
Mountain ranges of Scotland
Mountains
Highland Boundary Fault